Andrea Isufaj (born 21 November 1999) is an Italian football player of Albanian descent. He plays for Ambrosiana.

Club career
He made his Serie C debut for Lucchese on 16 September 2018 in a game against Arezzo.

On 11 September 2020 he signed a 2-year contract with Paganese. His Paganese contract was terminated by mutual consent on 1 February 2021.

On 10 February 2021, he joined Serie D club Ambrosiana.

References

External links
 

1999 births
Sportspeople from Brixen
Italian people of Albanian descent
Living people
Italian footballers
Association football forwards
A.C. ChievoVerona players
S.S.D. Lucchese 1905 players
Paganese Calcio 1926 players
Serie C players
Footballers from Trentino-Alto Adige/Südtirol